Fortis Healthcare Limited (FHL) is an Indian multinational chain of private hospitals headquartered in India. Fortis started its health care operations from Mohali, Punjab, where the first Fortis hospital was started. Later on, the hospital chain purchased the healthcare branch of Escorts group and increased its strength in various parts of the country. The Escorts Heart and research Center, Okhla, Delhi became a major operating unit of the chain. Dr. Tehran, the current MD of Medanta and several others have started their career from this institute.

The Fortis Memorial research Institute (FMRI) hospital at Gurgaon is the headquarter and flagship hospital of Fortis healthcare with all the major facilities at the hospital. It was named as 23rd smart hospital in the world for the year 2021. FMRI was also named as 22nd best hospital in the country for the year 2022 by Newsweek. 

Apart from Fortis Escorts Okhla, & FMRI, Fortis healthcare has other units in Delhi NCR as well which includes Fortis Hospital Faridabad, Noida, Vasant Kunj, Shalimar Bagh (Delhi) and at several other places in the country. Currently, the company operates its healthcare delivery services in India, Dubai and Sri Lanka with 36 healthcare facilities.

Malaysia's IHH Healthcare became the controlling shareholder of Fortis Healthcare Ltd by acquiring a 31.1% stake in the company. Fortis Healthcare also appointed four persons from IHH Healthcare to its board in a meeting held at Mohali. The board approved the allotment of over 230 million shares through preferential issue to Northern TK Venture Pte Ltd, a wholly owned indirect subsidiary of IHH Healthcare, at ₹170 per share of ₹10 face value.

Other information 
In 2018, Manipal Hospitals and TPG Capital acquired Fortis Healthcare Limited as part of a deal for  39,000 million. In 2019, Fortis Healthcare announced that it had completed the acquisition of RHT Health Trust (RHT) assets for an enterprise value of  46,500 million. In the same financial year, Fortis reported a consolidated net profit of  780.10 million for the quarter ended 30 June.

Fortis is also a component of the S&P BSE 500.

See also
 Healthcare in India
 Manipal Hospitals India
 Medanta

References

External links 
 

Hospitals in Haryana
Hospital networks in India
2018 mergers and acquisitions
Hospitals in Chennai
1996 establishments in Tamil Nadu
Indian companies established in 1996
Companies listed on the National Stock Exchange of India
Companies listed on the Bombay Stock Exchange